Liying railway station (station code: 24710) is a train station on the Beijing–Kowloon Railway in Daxing District, Beijing. This station has no passenger services since its completion in 2001.

Beijing–Shanghai High-Speed Railway is parallel to Beijing–Kowloon Railway near this station.

References

External links

Railway stations in China opened in 2001
Railway stations in Daxing District
Stations on the Beijing–Kowloon Railway